Kevin L. Johnson (born September 27, 1960) is an American politician who is a  Democratic member of the South Carolina Senate, representing the 36th District since 2012.

References

1960 births
Living people
African-American state legislators in South Carolina
Democratic Party South Carolina state senators
21st-century American politicians
People from Christian County, Kentucky
21st-century African-American politicians
20th-century African-American people